"Truth Is" is the first single from Brother Ali's second full-length album The Undisputed Truth. The single was released January 5, 2007 as a 12" vinyl, but was later released as a CD single and a digital download. Produced by Ant, the song features a reggae-style beat. Its lyrics focus are braggadocios and focus on Brother Ali's being "the truth."

The song failed to chart, but was a critical success and received local radio play. According to PopMatters, the song constantly won head-to-head call-in competitions against other popular rap songs on Minnesota's hip hop radio station B96.

Track listing

CD single/Digital download
 "Truth Is (Clean)" (3:54)
 "Truth Is (Album)" (3:54)
 "Truth Is (Inst)" (3:44)
 "Freedom Ain't Free (Clean)" (3:40)
 "Freedom Ain't Free (Album)" (3:40)
 "Freedom Ain't Free (Inst)" (3:40)
 "Original King (Clean)" (3:31)
 "Original King (Dirty)" (3:31)
 "Original King (Inst)" (3:28)

12" vinyl

A-Side
 "Truth Is (Clean)"
 "Truth Is (Dirty)"
 "Freedom Ain't Free (Clean)"

B-Side
 "Truth Is (Instrumental)"
 "Freedom Ain't Free (Instrumental)"
 "Original King"

References

External links
Brother Ali's Official Website with audio of "Truth Is"

2007 singles
Brother Ali songs
2007 songs